The 6th constituency of Seine-et-Marne is a French legislative constituency in the Seine-et-Marne département.

Description

The 6th constituency of Seine-et-Marne lies in the north of the department around the town of Meaux.

In the 1980s and 1990s the seat swung between left and right; however, since 2002 the seat has remained comfortably in the hands of Jean-François Copé of the UMP. Copé served as a minister under Nicolas Sarkozy and as president of the UMP between 2012 and 2014.

Historic Representation

Election results

2022

 
 
 
 
 
 
 
|-
| colspan="8" bgcolor="#E9E9E9"|
|-

2017

 
 
 
 
 
 
 
|-
| colspan="8" bgcolor="#E9E9E9"|
|-

2012

 
 
 
 
|-
| colspan="8" bgcolor="#E9E9E9"|
|-

2007

 
 
 
 
 
 
|-
| colspan="8" bgcolor="#E9E9E9"|
|-

2002

 
 
 
 
|-
| colspan="8" bgcolor="#E9E9E9"|
|-

1997

Sources

Official results of French elections from 2002: "Résultats électoraux officiels en France" (in French).

6